Donnie Brasco is a 1997 American crime drama film directed by Mike Newell, and starring Al Pacino and Johnny Depp. Michael Madsen, Bruno Kirby, James Russo, and Anne Heche appeared in supporting roles. The film, written by Paul Attanasio, is based on the 1988 nonfiction book Donnie Brasco: My Undercover Life in the Mafia by Joseph D. Pistone and Richard Woodley.

The film is loosely based on the true story of Pistone (Depp), an FBI undercover agent who infiltrated the Bonanno crime family in New York City during the 1970s, under the alias Donnie Brasco, a jewel thief from Vero Beach, Florida. Brasco maneuvers his way into the confidence of an aging Mafia hitman, Lefty Ruggiero (Pacino), who vouches for him. As Donnie moves deeper into the Mafia, he realizes that not only is he crossing the line between federal agent and criminal, but also leading his friend Lefty to an almost certain death.

Donnie Brasco premiered in Century City on February 24, 1997, and was released on February 28, 1997, by TriStar Pictures. The film was a box office success, earning $124.9 million against its $35 million budget, and received positive reviews from critics. The film was nominated for an Academy Award for Best Adapted Screenplay.

Plot 

In 1978 New York City, Lefty Ruggiero, an aging enforcer in the Bonanno crime family, meets Joe Pistone, a young undercover FBI agent posing as jewel thief "Donnie Brasco". Lefty asks Donnie to sell a diamond he acquired from a strip club owner, but Donnie insists that it's a fake. Insulted, Lefty takes Donnie to the man and demands an explanation. Donnie beats the owner and takes his Porsche as repayment. Lefty teaches Donnie the rules of the Mafia and introduces him to members of his crew, including Sonny Black, Nicky, Paulie, and rival crew leader Sonny Red. After the boss of the family is killed, Sonny receives a promotion, angering Lefty who feels his years of service make him more deserving. As the crew runs a series of successful shakedowns and hijackings in the city, Pistone exploits his position as Lefty's associate to gather information for the FBI via wiretap recordings. He also ends up forming a genuine bond with Lefty, who is struggling with family issues and a lifetime of debt.

Pistone is asked by his FBI supervisor to incorporate Miami-based undercover FBI Agent Richie Gazzo into the Donnie Brasco operation. He convinces Lefty to meet with Richie and set up an illegal gambling racket in a long-closed tavern he owns. Lefty hopes to impress the local mob boss, Santo Trafficante Jr., by throwing a yacht party and convincing him to support his new business. Sonny finds out about Lefty's plan and intercedes by ingratiating himself to Trafficante and officially taking Donnie under his wing. Lefty believes Donnie betrayed him and cuts ties with him until Lefty's son nearly dies of an overdose and Donnie is the only one who comes to comfort him. Pistone's marriage with his wife Maggie continues to worsen due to long absences while undercover, leaving her alone to look after their three daughters. Pistone's behavior increasingly becomes more like that of the criminal he pretends to be, even hitting Maggie when she talks back to him.

On its opening day, Sonny's club is raided by corrupt Miami Police officers on Trafficante's payroll as a favor for Sonny Red. Suspecting a setup, Sonny Black and his crew return to New York and gun down Sonny Red and two other mobsters in an ambush. Sonny Black also orders Lefty to kill Nicky for lying about a drug deal and suspecting he snitched on the crew in Florida. Donnie is brought in to help clean up and dispose of the bodies. Sonny Black becomes the new boss and orders Donnie to kill Sonny Red's son, Bruno, so that Donnie can officially become a member of their family. Lefty finds Bruno's hideout and takes Donnie there. Donnie tries to offer Lefty a bag of money so he can leave the Mafia, but Lefty begins questioning his loyalty at gunpoint. The FBI intercedes before Donnie is forced to do anything, and the investigation ends.

FBI agents visit Sonny Black's hangout and reveal Donnie's true identity to the crew. Knowing the fatal consequences that await him for unknowingly letting an FBI agent infiltrate the crime family, Lefty leaves behind his valuables and tells his wife that if Donnie calls to tell him "if it was going to be anyone, I'm glad it was him", before he is called to a meeting with his crew. With his family in attendance, Pistone attends a small private ceremony for his service, being awarded a medal and a $500 check.

The end title cards state that the evidence collected by Pistone in the Donnie Brasco operation led to over 200 indictments and over 100 convictions. Pistone lives with his wife under an assumed name in an undisclosed location, with a $500,000 open contract on his head.

Cast

Production 
When Pistone's book, Donnie Brasco: My Undercover Life in the Mafia was published in 1988, Louis DiGiaimo, who worked as a casting director for Barry Levinson, was a childhood acquaintance of Joseph D. Pistone, and served as a consultant for the book, bought the film rights. DiGiaimo brought it to Levinson's Baltimore Pictures, as well as producers Mark Johnson and Gail Mutrux, who then turned to Paul Attanasio to write the script. Stephen Frears was initially hired as director for the film, but when Goodfellas, another mob film, was released in 1990, the planning for the film was pushed back. Frears was adamant about casting Pacino to play Lefty. After several years of development hell, Frears was eventually replaced with Mike Newell as director, and development picked up in 1996. Pacino and Depp were ultimately cast in the co-starring roles, and Pistone was hired as a consultant to help them develop their characters.

Releases 
Donnie Brasco premiered in Century City, California on February 24, 1997. It was given a wide release in North America on February 28, 1997. It was released in the United Kingdom on May 2, 1997.

Donnie Brasco was released on DVD in October 2000 as a "special edition" with bonus materials such as commentary tracks. In January 2006, Donnie Brasco was released as part of a DVD mob box set along with Snatch, Bugsy and The American Gangster. In May 2007, Donnie Brasco was released on Blu-ray in an extended cut.

Reception

Box office
Donnie Brasco was released theatrically in North America on February 28, 1997. The film earned $11.6 million from 1,503 theaters during its opening weekend. It went on to earn $41.9 million in North America and $83 million from other markets, for a total of $124.9 million.

Critical response
On review aggregator website Rotten Tomatoes, Donnie Brasco has an approval rating of 88% based on 57 reviews, with an average rating of 7.80/10. The site's critical consensus reads, "A stark, nuanced portrait of life in organized crime, bolstered by strong performances from Al Pacino and Johnny Depp." Metacritic, which assigned a weighted average rating of 76 out of 100, based on 21 critics, reports the film has "generally favorable reviews". Audiences polled by CinemaScore gave the film an average grade of "B+" on an A+ to F scale.

Janet Maslin of The New York Times called it "a sharp, clever encounter, overturning all manner of genre cliches and viewer expectations... and the best crime movie in a long while, is full of similar surprises as it leads Mr. Pacino and Johnny Depp through a fine-tuned tale of deception." Entertainment Weekly called it a "wonderfully dense, clever, and moving gangland thriller," and gave it an A−, also praising Paul Attanasio's screenplay as "a rich, satisfying gumbo of back stabbing, shady business maneuvers, and mayhem." Siskel and Ebert gave Donnie Brasco "two thumbs up" on their syndicated television series. In his print review, Roger Ebert of the Chicago Sun-Times gave it three and a half stars out of four: the film had one of Pacino's best performances, and, according to Ebert, Donnie Brasco was rare in depicting "two men who grow to love each other, within the framework of a teacher-student relationship." Peter Travers of Rolling Stone praised the film, saying that "Donnie Brasco is one terrific movie." Mick LaSalle from the San Francisco Chronicle gave the film a positive review and said that Donnie Brasco was "a first class Mafia thriller."

Critics praised Depp's performance especially: a Salon.com review hailed Depp's performance as "sensational." New York Magazine called him "graceful" and found his acting highly believable: "We can believe that the mob might take him for a tough, ambitious young hood—he has the wariness and the self-confidence that creates an aura."

According to Charles Taylor in his review for Salon.com, both Pacino and Depp are "in top form"; in remarking on Pacino's frequent collaborations with younger actors (Sean Penn, John Cusack), Taylor called Donnie Brasco "the best in this series of duets" and singled out Pacino's skills: "His final scene is all the more heartbreaking for the economy of gesture and feeling he brings it. It's an exit that does justice to both the actor and the role, and it leaves an ache in the movie." Entertainment Weekly reserved its highest praise for Pacino: "If Donnie Brasco belongs to any actor, though, it's Al Pacino." The Playlist called it one of Pacino's best performances, writing "though Scent of A Woman, Two Bits and even (relatively) Heat showcased Pacino at his most exuberantly grandiose, Brasco brings him back to a performance of stealth and nuance".

See also 
 List of American films of 1997

References

External links 

 
 

1990s biographical drama films
1997 crime drama films
1997 films
American biographical drama films
American crime drama films
Biographical films about gangsters
Bonanno crime family
1990s English-language films
Films about the Federal Bureau of Investigation
Films based on non-fiction books about organized crime
Films directed by Mike Newell
Films scored by Patrick Doyle
Films set in 1978
Films set in Florida
Films set in Miami
Films set in New York City
Films shot in Florida
Films shot in Miami
Films shot in New York City
Films with screenplays by Paul Attanasio
Films about the American Mafia
Crime films based on actual events
Films about organized crime in the United States
Mandalay Pictures films
TriStar Pictures films
1990s American films